Travis Association for the Blind (TAB) is a 501(c)(3) non-profit organization employing over 400 Texans of which approximately 250 are legally blind in six facilities in southeast Austin, Texas as well as a facility in Taylor, Texas. Travis Association for the Blind warehouses, distributes, manufactures, and repairs a wide variety of merchandise for local, state, and federal government as well as private industry.

The mission of TAB is to enhance the opportunities for the economic and personal independence of people who are blind or visually impaired by creating, sustaining, and improving employment. TAB’s mission ensures long-term employment and training opportunities through AbilityOne and Texas State-Use strategic sourcing programs, as well as supporting the local community with job training and skill attainment. TAB is a National Industries for the Blind (NIB) partner agency.

History 
Commonly known as the Austin Lighthouse, the [Travis County] Association for the Blind was founded in 1934 eventually shortening its name to Travis Association for the Blind.

At its start, the organization employed blind people to produce woven mats and canning peaches. During World War II the United States government took advantage of the newly legislated Wagner-O'Day Act of 1938 and began purchasing mops produced at the Austin Lighthouse. In 1971, under the leadership of United States Senator Jacob Javits of New York the act was amended to include all individuals with severe disabilities, becoming the Javits–Wagner–O'Day Act (JWOD). Over the years, the Austin Lighthouse has manufactured a number of different sewing products, bottled and packaged 200+ different skin care products, and warehoused/distributed items for the military and state government customers.

Major League Baseball player "Prince" Oana worked for Travis Association for the Blind during seven years in the late 1950s and early 1960s because of cataracts in both eyes.

Today, the Austin Lighthouse is composed of three main divisions; distribution, manufacturing, and training/education.  The distribution division has approximately 800,000 sqft of warehouse space, receiving, sorting, identifying, laundering, repairing, labeling, packaging, and distributing items for the U.S. Army, Marine Corps, Air Force, Navy, and Coast Guard.  In the manufacturing division, a variety of skincare products are produced, as well as textiles, notebook binders, award plaques, and others.  The Training and Education Services division provides skill-enhancing training, adaptive equipment, and employment searching services to blind and visually impaired customers.

Products 
In a partnership with GOJO Industries, TAB packages and redistributes skincare products, including PURELL Instant hand Sanitizer and MICRELL antibacterial hand soap under the Skilcraft® trade name.

TAB also manufactures the following products:
 Military uniform trousers and rigger belts
 Award plaques
 Key cases
 Soap dispensers
 Binders

Services 
The Austin Lighthouse's Distribution Services department currently has two federal contracts. One is with the Air Force and Marine Corps providing Third Party Logistics (AF/MC3PL) support. In it, the Austin Lighthouse provides supply chain services to the U.S. Armed Forces through a contract with Defense Logistics Agency Troop Support formerly Defense Supply Center Philadelphia.
In the other large distribution services contract, Austin Lighthouse provides distribution, laundry, and repair services for the United States Army through the Regional Logistics Support Center (RLSC). The RLSC facilities are located in south Austin and Taylor, Texas.

References

External links 
 The Travis Association for the Blind website
 GOJO Skilcraft Website

Blindness organizations in the United States
Organizations based in Austin, Texas
Non-profit organizations based in Texas
Organizations established in 1934